The 1927–28 Detroit Cougars season was the second season of the Detroit, Michigan National Hockey League (NHL) franchise. The Detroit Cougars scored 44 points, finishing fourth in the American Division and failing to make the playoffs in their sophomore year.

The Cougars finally moved into what would be their home for the next fifty years, Detroit's Olympia Stadium. Their also received a new coach and general manager in Jack Adams. Adams made an immediate impact, picking up Reg Noble and quickly naming him Captain. Detroit performed much better to start off the season and only finished two points out of a playoff spot.

Regular season

Season standings

Record vs. opponents

Schedule and results

November

Record: 2–2–1; Home: 1–1–0; Road: 1–1–1

December

Record: 6–4–2; Home: 3–2–1; Road: 3–2–1

January

Record: 4–5–0; Home: 2–3–0; Road: 2–2–0

February

Record: 1–4–3; Home: 0–2–2; Road: 1–2–1

March

Record: 6–4–0; Home: 3–2–0; Road: 3–2–0

Green background indicates win.
Red background indicates regulation loss.
Yellow background indicates tie.

Playoffs

The Detroit Cougars failed to make the playoffs.

Player stats

Skaters

Note: GP = Games played; G = Goals; A = Assists; Pts = Points; +/- = Plus/minus; PIM = Penalty minutes

*Stats reflect games played with Detroit only.

Goaltending

Note: GP = Games played; TOI = Time on ice (minutes); W = Wins; L = Losses; OTL = Overtime losses; GA = Goals against; SO = Shutouts; SV% = Save percentage; GAA = Goals against average

Awards and records

Trophies and awards

Records

Milestones

Transactions
The Cougars were involved in the following transactions during the 1926–27 season.

Trades

Free agents

See also
1927–28 NHL season

References

Statistics
Player stats: Detroit Red Wings player stats on hockeydb.com
Game log: Detroit Red Wings game log on detroithockey.net
Team standings: NHL standings on hockeydb.com

Notes

Detroit
Detroit
Detroit Red Wings seasons
Detroit Cougars
Detroit Cougars